The 16th Artistic Gymnastics World Championships were held in Dortmund, West Germany, in 1966.  During these championships, new elements were performed including a full-twisting piked dismount from high bar, a layout with full turn (rings), and a double somersault.

Results

Medals

Men

Team competition

All-around

Floor Exercise

Pommel Horse

Rings

Vault

Parallel Bars

Horizontal Bar

Women

Team competition

All-around

Vault

Uneven Bars

Balance Beam

Floor Exercise

References

Gymn Forum: World Championships Results
Gymnastics

World Artistic Gymnastics Championships
International gymnastics competitions hosted by West Germany
1966 in German sport
1966 in gymnastics